Le Bouchage is the name of 2 communes in France:

 Le Bouchage, Charente
 Le Bouchage, Isère